Baddegama is a main town in Galle District, Southern Province, Sri Lanka.

The main livelihood for the town was paddy cultivation but that has now changed to tea cultivation as well as rubber, coconut, cinnamon, pepper and minor export cultivation.

Education
Baddegama has five main schools.
 Christ Church Boys' College (National School)
 Christ Church Girls' School (National School)
 St Anthony's College (Secondary School)
 Rathnasara College 
 Roman Catholic College

Transport 
Baddegama Main Central Bus-stand 

Colombo, Galle including more than 30 destination Bus route's Start from Baddegama main bus-stand.

People from Baddegama 
 Simon Abeywickrema
 Henry Abeywickrema

See also 
List of towns in Southern Province, Sri Lanka

Populated places in Southern Province, Sri Lanka